CQ magazine can refer to several different publications:

 Congressional Quarterly
 CQ Amateur Radio
 CQ ham radio
 The Classical Quarterly